Captain Miho Otani (大谷 三穂) (born May 28, 1971) is an officer in the Japanese Maritime Self-Defense Force. She was the first woman to become the captain of a naval training vessel and a destroyer. Otani was also a member of the first female class to enter the National Defense Academy of Japan.

Career 
Otani initially planned to study at Ryukoku University. When she was in her second year of high school she saw news about the Gulf War and decided to apply to the National Defense Academy of Japan instead. Though her family did not approve, she entered the Academy in April 1992 as a member of the first female class. At first she wanted to be a pilot, but she ended up being assigned to the Maritime Self-Defense Force, where she worked on the training ship JDS Natsugumo.

In March 2013, Otani became the captain of the training ship Shimayuki. Alongside Ryoko Azuma, she was the first woman to become the captain of a training ship. On July 1, 2017, she was promoted to captain. On December 2, 2019, She took command of  making her the first woman to command a JMSDF Aegis destroyer.

See also 

 Misa Matsushima – First woman in the Japanese Self-Defense Force to become a fighter pilot

References 

Living people
1971 births
People from Osaka Prefecture
National Defense Academy of Japan alumni
Japan Maritime Self-Defense Force personnel